The 2022 Bhutan Premier League is the eleventh season of the unified league, rebranded as the Bhutan Premier League since 2019 (previously the Bhutan National League), the top national football competition in Bhutan, having replaced the A-Division in 2013.

Teams

Stadiums and locations

Personnel and sponsorship

League table

Seasonal statistics

Top goalscorers

Hat-tricks

 5 Player scored 5 goals
 4 Player scored 4 goals

References

External links
Facebook page of Bhutan Football Federation
Facebook page of Bhutan Premier League
Season statistics at RSSSF

Bhutan National League seasons
Bhutan
1